Soda Lake (or Soda Dry Lake) is a dry lake at the terminus of the Mojave River in the Mojave Desert of San Bernardino County, California. The lake has standing water during wet periods, and water can be found beneath the surface.

Soda Lake along with Silver Lake are what remains of the large, perennial, Holocene Lake Mojave. The waters of the lake, now with no outlet, evaporate and leave alkaline evaporites of sodium carbonate and sodium bicarbonate.

Soda Lake is located on the southern side of Interstate 15, and can be seen at the Zzyzx Road interchange and the Oat Ditch bridge, as well as the Soda Lake bridge (signed as the Mojave River) looking south from the city of Baker.

See also
 List of lakes in California
 Kelso Wash
 Zzyzx, California

References

External links

Lakes of the Mojave Desert
Lakes of San Bernardino County, California
Endorheic lakes of California
Salt flats of California
Mojave River
Mojave National Preserve
Landforms of San Bernardino County, California
Lakes of California
Lakes of Southern California